The French destroyer Épée was one of a dozen s built for the French Navy during the late 1930s. The ship was completed during the Battle of France in mid-1940 and her first mission was to help escort an incomplete battleship to French Morocco only days before the French signed an armistice with the Germans. After the British attack on Dakar in September, she was one of four destroyers ordered to attack British shipping, although there was only an inconclusive duel with a British destroyer. Épée helped to escort one of the battleships damaged by the British during their July Attack on Mers-el-Kébir, French Algeria, back to France in November. She was transferred back to French Morocco in May 1941 for convoy-escort duties that lasted until October.

When the Germans occupied Vichy France after the Allies landed in French North Africa in November 1942 and tried to seize the French fleet, Épée was one of the ships scuttled to prevent their capture. The ship was refloated in 1945 and subsequently scrapped.

Design and description
They were powered by two geared steam turbines, each driving one propeller shaft, using steam provided by four Sural-Penhöet forced-circulation boilers. The crew consisted of 10 officers and 177 enlisted men.

The main armament of the Le Hardi-class ships consisted of six Canon de 130 mm Modèle 1932 guns in three twin mounts, one forward and a superfiring pair aft of the superstructure. Their anti-aircraft (AA) armament consisted of one twin mount for  AA guns and two twin Hotchkiss  anti-aircraft machine gun mounts. The ships carried one triple and two twin sets of  torpedo tubes, all above-water. One depth charge chute was built into the stern; this housed eight  depth charges. The other side of the stern was used for the handling gear for a "Ginocchio" anti-submarine torpedo, but this was removed before the ship was completed.

Modifications
In late 1941 and early 1942 the twin Hotchkiss machine guns were repositioned on the quarterdeck and a pair of single mounts for  Hotchkiss AA guns were installed in their place in front of the bridge. In addition a pair of single mounts for Browning 13.2-millimeter AA machine guns were added on platforms on the sides of the superfiring turret aft.

Construction and career
Ordered on 31 December 1935, Épée was laid down by Forges et Chantiers de la Gironde at their shipyard in Bordeaux on 15 October 1936. She was launched on 26 October 1938 and entered service on 14 June 1940. On 28 July, Épée and Le Hardi sailed for Dakar, French West Africa and the former arrived back at Casablanca on 10 September. They encountered only an unidentified British destroyer and all of Épées guns malfunctioned after firing a total of only 14 rounds. The ships continued onward to Oran, French Algeria, and Épée returned to Casablanca on 30 September.

The following months saw five of the Le Hardi-class ships ordered to Oran to escort the battleship , which had been damaged during the July British attack on Mers-el-Kébir, Algeria, to Toulon; Épée arrived there on 5 November. Departing the following day, they arrived at Toulon two days later at which time the ship was reduced to reserve. On 29 March 1941, Épée was renamed L'Adroit to commemorate the destroyer of that name that had been sunk during the Battle of France in 1940. The ship was transferred to Morocco on 8 May for convoy-escort duties and returned to Toulon on 4 October. When the Nazi Germans attempted to capture the French ships intact in Toulon on 27 November 1942, L'Adroit was scuttled by her crew. The Italians raised her on 20 April 1943 and redesignated her as FR33, but the ship was badly damaged during Allied bombing raids on 24 November 1943 and 4 February 1944; she was refloated in September 1945 and broken up.

Notes

References

 
 

Le Hardi-class destroyers
Naval ships of France captured by Italy during World War II
1938 ships
World War II warships scuttled at Toulon
Maritime incidents in November 1942